The men's 4 × 364 metres relay event at the 1968 European Indoor Games was held on 9 March in Madrid. Each athlete ran two laps of the 182 metres track.

Results

References

4 × 400 metres relay at the European Athletics Indoor Championships
Relay